Governor Cox may refer to the following:

Channing H. Cox (1879–1968), 49th Governor of Massachusetts
Jacob Dolson Cox (1828–1900), 28th Governor of Ohio
James M. Cox (1870–1957), 46th and 48th Governor of Ohio
John I. Cox (1855–1946), 29th Governor of Tennessee
Keeaumoku II (1784–1824), Royal Governor of Maui, known as "Governor Cox" by foreigners
Spencer Cox (politician) (born 1975), 18th Governor of Utah
William Cox (governor) (born 1936), 26th Governor of Tasmania